The Ministry of Micro, Small and Medium Enterprises is the ministry in the Government of India. It is the apex executive body for the formulation and administration of rules, regulations and laws relating to micro, small and medium enterprises in India. The Minister of Micro, Small and Medium Enterprises is Narayan Rane.

The statistics provided by the annual reports of Ministry of Small and Medium Enterprises (MSME) shows a rise in the plan amount spent on the khadi sector from ₹1942.7 million to ₹14540 million, and non-plan amounts from ₹437 million to ₹2291 million, in the period from 1994–95 to 2014–2015. The interest subsidies to khadi institutions increased from ₹96.3 million to ₹314.5 million in this period.

History
The Ministry of Small Scale Industries and Agro and Rural Industries was created in October 1999. In September 2001, the ministry was split into the Ministry of Small Scale Industries and the Ministry of Agro and Rural Industries. The President of India amended the Government of India (Allocation of Business) Rules, 1961, under the notification dated 9 May 2007. Pursuant to this amendment, they were merged into a single ministry.

The ministry was tasked with the promotion of micro and small enterprises. The Small Industries Development Organisation was under the control of the ministry, as was the National Small Industries Corporation Limited  public sector undertaking).

The Small Industries Development Organisation was established in 1954 on the basis of the recommendations of the Ford Foundation. It has over 60 offices and 21 autonomous bodies under its management. These autonomous bodies include Tool Rooms, Training Institutions and Project-cum-Process Development Centres.

Services provided include:
Facilities for testing, toolmenting, training for entrepreneurship development
Preparation of project and product profiles
Technical and managerial consultancy
Assistance for exports
Pollution and energy audits

It also provides economic information services and advises Government in policy formulation for the promotion and development of SSIs. The field offices also work as effective links between the Central and State Governments.

Ministry of Agro and Rural Industries
The now-defunct Ministry of Agro and Rural Industries had the objectives of facilitating coordinated and focused policy formulation and effective implementation of programmes, projects, schemes, etc., for improving supply chain management, enhancing skills, upgrading technology, expanding markets and capacity building of entrepreneurs/artisans and their groups/collectives.

The Ministry deals with the khadi, village and coir industries through the Khadi and Village Industries Commission (KVIC) and the Coir Board. It coordinates implementation of two countrywide employment generation programmes, namely, the Rural Employment Generation Programme (REGP) and the Prime Minister's Rozgar Yojana (PMRY) with the cooperation of State Governments, the Reserve Bank of India (RBI) and other banks. The KVIC, established by an Act of Parliament, is a statutory organisation engaged in promotion and development of khadi and village industries for providing employment opportunities in the rural areas, thereby strengthening the rural economy. The coir industry is a labour-intensive and export-oriented industry. It uses a by-product of coconut, namely, coir husk. The Coir Board, a statutory body established under the Coir Industry Act 1953, looks after the promotion, growth and development of the coir industry, including export promotion and expansion of the domestic market.

It was headed by the Minister of Agro & Rural Industries and was based at Udyog Bhavan, Rafi Marg, New Delhi. Shri Mahabir Prasad was the last incumbent.

Related organisations
 MSME-Technology Centre Baddi Solan
 Central Tool Room, Ludhiana
 Central Tool Room Extension Centre, Nilokheri earlier functional as Integrated Training Centre, Nilokheri 
 Indo Danish Tool Room, Jamshedpur

Integrated Training Centre, Nilokheri 
Integrated Training Centre, Nilokheri was an employment and training agency in Nilokheri in Karnal district in the state of Haryana owned and managed by the Government of India and responsible for upgrading technical skills of technicians.

It was built around the vocational training centre that was transferred from Kurukshetra, in July, 1948 to the 1100 acres of swampy land on the Delhi-Ambala highway as one of several enterprises intended to provide employment and training for displaced persons following the partition of India
This training centre was under Small Industries belonged to subhash mukherjee 
Development Organisation and used to provided training to extension officers (industries of State Governments as well as managers and technician entrepreneurs both in  modern small scale and traditional village industries. During the Year 1986-87 the centre trained 200 technician, 85 women under core women training programme and 57 SIDO officers.

Functions
It provides technical training to artisans and workers sponsored by the state government. It also organises training of Extension Officers engaged in various developmental organisation. It provides summer training programs for Degree/Diploma Engineers.

ITC as Central Tool Room Extension Centre, Nilokheri
Due to some conflict between the Principal and Vice-Principal of Integrated Training Centre was relinquished.
Later in the year 2014 the center was taken over by Ministry of Micro, Small and Medium Enterprises which led to its development as Extension center for Central Tool Room, Ludhiana i.e. Central Tool Room Extension Center, Nilokheri. Currently running various technical short term courses.

Centre structure and functions
The centre comes under the  Government of India and has a Principal and a Vice Principal. The Ministry regulates:

 Khadi and Village Industries Commission 
 National Commission for Enterprises in the Unorganised Sector
 National Small Industries Corporation Ltd.
 National School of Leadership
 National Institute for Micro, Small and Medium Enterprises
 National Institute for Entrepreneurship & Small Business Development
 Indian Institute of Entrepreneurship

Initiatives

Prime Minister Employment Generation Programme
It was launched as a central sector scheme in 2008–09 to promote self employment in the country through setting up micro enterprises. It is a credit linked subsidy scheme in which loans up to 25 lakh for manufacturing sector and up to 1000 Lakh for service sector is forwarded to the eligible beneficiaries for which subsidy of up to 35% is provided to them.

The Khadi and Village Industries Commission is the implementing agency at the National level. The individuals who are above the age of 18 years and are at least 8th pass, self help groups, Societies registered under Societies Registration Act, 1860, Charitable trusts are all eligible to be beneficiary. Also, only new projects are considered for sanction under the scheme.

Announcement in Budget 2023
In Budget 2023, Government of India announced that MSMEs who failed to execute their contracts during the COVID period, then government undertakings would refund 95% of the performance security forfeited. Furthermore,  GOI empower MSMEs in terms of early payments by declaring that no company shall claim expenses deduction until enterprises make the payment of MSMEs.

Ministers of Small Scale Industries

Ministers of Agro and Rural Industries

Ministers of Micro, Small and Medium Enterprise

List of Ministers of State

See also
 Ministry of Small Scale Industries

References

External links
Ministry of Micro, Small and Medium Enterprises
 Ministry of Agro and Rural Industries

Government ministries of India